

The Martinsyde F.1 was a British two-seat biplane fighter designed and built by Martinsyde Limited, only two prototypes were built.

Design and development
The F.1 was designed as a fighter for the Royal Flying Corps and it was a large tractor biplane powered by a  Rolls-Royce Mk III piston engine. It had two tandem open cockpits with unusually the observer forward and the pilot behind. It was tested at Martlesham Heath in July 1917, where it demonstrated good handling but was criticised for the awkward crew arrangement. It was not ordered into production and only one prototype (of two ordered) was built. It continued in use at Farnborough until after the end of the war.

Specifications

References

Notes

Bibliography

F.1
1910s British fighter aircraft
Single-engined tractor aircraft
Biplanes
Aircraft first flown in 1917